Keith Davies is a Welsh Labour politician and was the National Assembly for Wales member for Llanelli from 2011 until 2016. He beat Helen Mary Jones who was the deputy leader of Plaid Cymru, and incumbent AM for Llanelli, in May 2011.

He is a member of the Enterprise and Business Committee, and Environment and Sustainability Committee.  His membership of crossparty groups includes: The Armed Forces and Cadets, Human Trafficking, Kidney, Older people, and Muscular Dystrophy.  He is the founding chair of the Cross Party Group on the Welsh Language.

Davies was a teacher and a Director of Education at Carmarthenshire County Council, but lost his job in 2000 when departments were merged.  He sued for unfair dismissal and won his case against Carmarthenshire County Council 

In 2004 he was elected Labour county councillor for the ward of Hengoed. He lost the seat to Plaid Cymru in 2008.

Personal life
Davies was born in Gwaun-Cae- Gurwen and educated at Ystalyfera Grammar School before studying Mathematics and Physics at Swansea University.  His interests include following the Llanelli Scarlets and Furnace Rugby Football Club.

Disrepute charge
In 2012, he apologised to the Assembly for his drunken behaviour at a Cardiff hotel.

Illness
On 28 September 2012, Davies was admitted to hospital being described as being seriously ill. On 23 October 2012, he was discharged from hospital with the diagnosis of a blood clot.

References

External links
 Personal political website

Welsh Labour members of the Senedd
Wales AMs 2011–2016
Welsh-speaking politicians
School governors
Year of birth missing (living people)
Living people